Law enforcement personnel use a large body of acronyms, abbreviations, codes and slang, in both spoken and written communication.

References

External links

Menlo Park Police Daily Log Glossary (PDF) (the local police department in Menlo Park, California)
Staffordshire Police Jargon Buster (the Police Force in Staffordshire, England) 
UK Police Slang and Acronyms(a large and growing list of police slang submitted by Police forum members)
Legal Jargon Glossary (a large list of legal terms and jargon used by Attorneys)
Police Glossary (a large list of police terms and jargon related to arrests)

 
Law enforcement-related lists